Joseph Balthasar Hochreither (Salzburg, 16 April 1669 - Salzburg, 14 December 1731) was an Austrian organist and composer. He may have been a student of Heinrich Biber.

Works, editions and recordings
 Vesperae Joannis Hochenreitter [Joseph Balthasar Hochreither] de Anno 1706 in folio.
 Requiem (1712); Missa Jubilus sacer (1731). St. Florianer Sängerknaben, Ars Antiqua Austria, dir.  Gunar Letzbor. Pan Classics PC 10264.

Links
Deinhammer, Peter (2008) Joseph Balthasar Hochreither (1669-1731). Dissertation, Universität Wien.

References

Austrian organists
Male organists
Austrian male composers
1669 births
Musicians from Salzburg
1731 deaths